The 2006 Japan Softball Cup is a four-team tournament in women's softball, held in Yokohama, Japan between 17 November and 19 November.

Results

November 17, 2006

November 18, 2006

Bronze medal match
November 19, 2006

Gold medal match
November 19, 2006

External links
 Official website

Softball competitions
Softball Cup
Softball Cup
Softball competitions in Japan